The Dhanush (bow) is a 155 mm towed howitzer manufactured by Advanced Weapons and Equipment India Limited previously a part of Ordnance Factory Board. The gun was approved for service in 2019.

Development
The Dhanush project was started by OFB to replace the older 105 mm Indian Field Gun, 105 mm Light Field Gun and the Russian 122 mm guns with a modern 155 mm artillery gun. It is manufactured by OFB at its Gun Carriage Factory Jabalpur.

The initial indigenous development of artillery guns in India started in the 1970s with the Artillery Gun Development Team under Brigadier Gurdyal Singh at Gun Carriage Factory, Jabalpur. This resulted in the introduction of 105 mm artillery guns into the Indian Army.

The purchase of Haubits FH77 guns manufactured by Bofors in the 1980s included technology transfer to OFB. After many years being unable to acquire or import foreign artillery guns due to the corruption charges, OFB developed the Dhanush gun.

In trials it came out better by 20 to 25 percent than the Haubits FH77 in parameters like range, accuracy, consistency, low and high angle of fire and shoot-and-scoot ability.

Three Dhanush guns were handed over to the Indian Army for user trials in July 2016. Battery trials were expected to be completed by July 2017 with 18 guns entering service in 2017, 36 guns in 2018 and 60 guns in 2019, for an Indian Army order of 114 guns.
However, the Ordinance factory board hasn't delivered the first regiment of this gun as of 12th Aug 2021. Each regiment has 18 guns and two are reserved. They have an initial order of 114 guns to be executed.

The Dhanush experienced a few problem during trials, failing on three occasions in a row in 2017.

It was reported in July 2017 that the howitzer failed the last phase of testing, due to the shell hitting the muzzle brake. A redesign of the barrel by widening it was being considered to solve the issue. Later an investigation revealed the incident happened due to a defective shell. Further trials were conducted by firing about 5000 shells in the desert regions and icy glaciers of the Himalayas without any incident. The gun is planned to enter service in four to five months. In June 2018, Dhanush completed final development trials. In February 2019, it was approved for series production.

The gun was officially inducted by the army on 8 April 2019. 93 Field Regiment becoming one of the first units to be armed with this gun and had the honour to participate in the 71st Republic Day Parade and Army Day parade in 2020 with its new equipment.

Upgrade 
Advanced Weapons and Equipment India upgraded 155 mm/45 calibre into 155 mm/52 calibre gun which can now fire upto 42 km. Dhanush weighs less than 14 tons, and is considered the lightest howitzer in the 155 mm category. The newly upgraded gun has double baffle muzzle brake and retractable barrel. The upgraded Dhanush successfully completed the testing phase.

Ramjet Propelled Artillery Shell 
IIT Madras along with IIT Kanpur, Armament Research and Development Establishment (ARDE) and Research Centre Imarat (RCI) are working on redesigning an existing 155 mm shell using ramjet propulsion with 60 km+ range that will be compatible with Dhanush. It will use precision guidance kit for trajectory correction. IIT Madras is ensuring that Munitions India can manufacture the shells.

Variant
A vehicle mounted variant of the gun called Mounted Gun System was showcased by OFB at the Defexpo 2018 show. The gun is mounted on a 8x8 Tatra truck manufactured under license by Bharat Earth Movers Limited (BEML) and has a 30 km/h cross country speed and 80 km/h road speed.

Users

: Indian Army - 114 units ordered, 18 delivered. First regiment is operational near Line of Actual Control (LAC). Second regiment of 18 guns will be raised by March 2023.

See also
DRDO Advanced Towed Artillery Gun System
Haubits FH77
Bharat-52

References

Field artillery
Artillery of India
155 mm artillery
Military equipment introduced in the 2010s